The first National Meeting of Black Women ((ENMN) took place in Brazil from 2 to 4 December 1988, in Valença, Rio de Janeiro, with 450 women from 17 Brazilian states. This meeting came about from a desire for greater solidarity and organizational structure among black Brazilian women, especially Fluminense women, who had previously organized the First State Meeting of Black Women of Rio de Janeiro in 1987.

Meeting

The National Meeting challenged some sectors of the feminist movement, and male leaders of the black movement. The meeting occurred in the Brazilian city of Nova Iguaçu, Rio de Janeiro. Attendees from Rio de Janeiro had also participated in the IX Encontro Feminista, in Garanhuns, where some noted that racial concerns were short-changed in discussions. According to Sandra Bello, questions of class and race featured prominently. Many feminists did not accept the active participation of black women, including their discussion and representation of issues concerning the favelas; white feminists were challenged at the state-level meetings about their control of "quotas of participation of black women in the Meetings".

See also 

 Afro-Brazilian feminism
 Feminism in Brazil
 Women's rights in Brazil

References

Conferences in Brazil
Feminism in Brazil
Gatherings of women